The Sao Khua Formation is a middle member of the Khorat Group. It consists of an alteration of pale red to yellowish-gray, fine to medium-grained sandstone and grayish-reddish brown siltstone and clay. Rare pale red to light gray conglomerates, containing carbonate pebbles, are also characteristic of this formation. This geological formation in Thailand dates to the Early Cretaceous age, specifically the Valanginian through Hauterivian stages.

Dinosaur remains are among the fossils that have been recovered from the formation.

Depositional environment
Baser on paleosols and lithostratigraphy, the Sao Khua Formation is believed to have been deposited in a warm to slightly cool semi-arid climate by a meandering river system. Geochemistry is indicative of a stable humid subtropical climate regime, and sedimentation is thought to have occurred in a floodplain setting which was fed by bedload-rich large meandering channels. Paleocurrent analysis suggests the sand channels at the time of deposition of the formation probably formed a braided channel environment.

Fossil content

Amphibians

Reptiles

Dinosaurs 

 Sauropoda indet. 1 and 2

Lizards

Pseudosuchians

Pterosaurs

Turtles

Fish

Bony fish

Cartilaginous fish

Invertebrates

Bivalves

See also 
 List of dinosaur-bearing rock formations

References 

Geologic formations of Thailand
Lower Cretaceous Series of Asia
Cretaceous Thailand
Sandstone formations
Conglomerate formations
Paleontology in Thailand
Valanginian Stage
Hauterivian Stage